Glen Allen High School, established in 2010, is a public school located in Henrico County, Virginia. The mascot of GAHS is the Jaguar, and the school's current principal is Reginald Davenport. Glen Allen is the 16th best high school in Virginia, the 533rd best high school in America, and is one of nine high schools in Henrico County. 65 percent of the student body participates in AP classes. The student body is 51 percent female and 49 percent male.
38 percent of the school is made up of minorities. Glen Allen has a 19:1 student-faculty ratio. Virginia House of Representatives' Delegate Schuyler VanValkenburg, among other political, business and non-profit leaders in Virginia are among the faculty. Glen Allen is a Gold Level LEED Certified building, and is the only school in the county with this distinction. 

Barry Gabay wrote in the University of Richmond Law Review circa 2015 that "The new building offers an ideal learning environment to students residing in Henrico County."

Curriculum
The curriculum includes Advanced Placement (AP) courses. Both standard and advanced diplomas are issued. Advanced diplomas are given to students who take advanced courses in several different subjects.

Academic performance 
Students planning to attend community colleges or universities made up 82% of the Class of 2014. That year, of the 1,055 AP examinations administered to students at this school, 62% received scores of three through five. Many students attend universities in Virginia, around the U.S., and the world. Common universities include Virginia Commonwealth University, Old Dominion University, George Mason University, James Madison University, Virginia Tech, and University of Virginia. Students have also attended Georgetown University, George Washington University, University of Edinburgh, Johns Hopkins University, Cornell University, Northwestern University, Duke University, JTS/Columbia University, Harvard University, and The Wharton School of the University of Pennsylvania, among many others.

Sports 

Glen Allen's athletic teams are named the "Jaguars" and they compete in the Virginia High School League's Colonial District. 

Sports are popular at the school, and a variety are offered. Football games are highly attended, among basketball games, wrestling matches and lacrosse games. 

Sports Offered:

References 

 https://www.usnews.com/education/best-high-schools/virginia/districts/henrico-county-pubilc-schools/glen-allen-high-school-92328

External links

 Glen Allen High School

Public high schools in Virginia
2010 establishments in Virginia
Educational institutions established in 2010
Schools in Henrico County, Virginia